Waste management in Kazakhstan is an important concern within the country, considering the billions of tons of industrial waste produced yearly, the currently less-than-optimal state of solid waste management, and existing toxins remaining from both pollutants and Kazakhstan's historical position as the USSR's testing grounds for rockets and nuclear weapons.  Kazakhstan has very few services for recycling solid waste, and waste management is currently dealt with using regional programs.

Main waste management sectors in Kazakhstan

Industrial waste 
Continuous generation and accumulation of waste, including hazardous waste (Persistent Organic Pollutants (POPs), medical waste, etc.).
Almost one third of industrial waste in the country is accumulated in Karaganda region - more than 8.5 billion tons by the end of 2012.

The main volume of emissions in Karaganda region accounts for metallurgical sphere and equals to 70%. This is the share of two major metallurgic companies - Arcelor Mittal Temirtau JSC and Kazakhmys Corporation. In the period from 2008 to 2012 Arcelor Mittal Temirtau has paid the penalty of more than one billion tenge for noncompliance of emission standards, Kazakhmys Corporation - more than 300 million tenge.
According to the results of 2012 the expected decline in total emissions in Karaganda equals to 31% compared to 2008. This is mainly the merit of environmental protection program of a single enterprise - "BalkhashTsvetMet", a subsidiary of Kazakhmys Corporation. In 2008 "BalkhashTsvetMet" has commissioned production on the basis of sulfuric acid. This action has reduced the emissions of sulfur dioxide from 578,000 tons in 2008 to 254,000 tons in 2012.
In Kazakhstan, as elsewhere in the world, liquid and gaseous types of industrial waste are a major concern for environmental organizations. Industrial discharges and gaseous emissions are priorities for state control and regulation of all enterprises in Kazakhstan. Methods of inspection, as well as ecological and economic standards have been developed in the country for all categories of liquid and gaseous waste products. At the same time, solid waste produced by the mining, concentrating, refining and power industries has accumulated all over the country without controls. This is largely caused by the following factors:
 Lack of research on environmental impact assessment (EIA) of solid waste and health risks;
 Absence of legal and economic leverage to control the entities storing waste in breach of sanitary regulations;
 Lack of a regulatory framework and technical equipment for environmental monitoring at the local level;
 Lack of access to information on waste composition and class of hazard
The issue of solid waste accumulation is of special concern in Kazakhstan given its economy's reliance on extraction and processing industries, which produce a huge amount of waste. About 21 billion tons of solid waste of all types has accumulated in the country. Its incremental growth amounts to 1 billion tons a year (Annex). Most solid waste is stored in Karaganda (29.4%), Eastern Kazakhstan (25.7%), Kostanai (17.0%) and Pavlodar (14.6%) oblasts.

Consumption waste 
The major issues here are: increase in the formation and accumulation of municipal solid waste; existing state of separate collection, recovery and recycling of municipal waste.

According to the Ministry of Environment, the country has accumulated 23 billion tons of municipal solid waste (MSW). Annual increase of accumulated solid waste equals to 700 million tons. Only 3-5% of garbage is being recycled. About 97% is stored in outdoor dumps.
The greatest amount of MSW is concentrated in Almaty, the most populous city in the country. For the last year, city dumps accumulated 470 thousand tons of solid waste.

By today there are 4,587 garbage polygons in the country, 3,927 of which do not meet environmental and health standards. Only 603 polygons (13%) meet the health standards at some extent, and are authorized to emissions to the environment.

Pollution types and causes

Air pollution 
The power sector in Kazakhstan is one of the main sources of atmospheric pollution through its emissions of sulfur oxide, nitrogen, carbon monoxide and ash. In 1990 the energy sector emitted around 2.3 million tons of such pollution, accounting for 35% of total atmospheric emissions and 53% of emissions from stationary sources. In 1996, there were about 1 million tons emitted, or 28% of the total volume of emissions and 41% of emissions from stationary sources. Much of this pollution is caused by the use of low quality coal as the main fuel, and also by poorly equipped thermal power stations with systems of purification of volatile gases of boiler-houses.

Due to decreases in thermal and electric power production the amounts of pollutants emitted by the energy sector have decreased by almost 50%. Nevertheless, the atmospheric pollution problem caused by the energy sector remains severe.

Weight of pollutants from heating and power generation enterprises, ferrous and nonferrous metallurgy and oil and gas sector

Pollution by persistent organic pollutants 
Persistent organic pollutants (POPs) are a group of chemicals - industrial substances such as poly-chloride biphenyl, pesticides of the dichlorodiphenyltrichloroethane (DDT) type and harmful waste products of dioxin type - the compounds and mixtures of which have toxic properties, are resistant to decomposition and higher bioaccumulation. As a result of transboundary transfer by air and water, they settle long distances from their emission points, accumulating in water and land ecosystems. The major sources of pollution by persistent organic contaminants in Kazakhstan are agriculture and outdated production processes.

The majority of pesticides used in Kazakhstan are herbicides and insecticides. In the last two decades, the volume of pesticide usage decreased almost fourfold. According to the Customs Committee, a total of 5346 million kg of persistent organic contaminants were imported in 2000, including 4,026,346 kg of herbicides, 64,702 kg of fungicides, 598,645 kg of insecticides, 10,000 kg of defoliants and 646,556 kg of other pesticides. In the first quarter of 2002 more than 6.36 million kg of pesticides were imported.

According to official data, only permitted compounds are imported to Kazakhstan.

Pollution by toxic waste products 
Out of 21 billion tons of industrial wastes accumulated in the country, 5.2 billion are toxic. In 1999, the annual volume of toxic wastes amounted to 92 million tons, of which 60% were wastes of metallurgic industries.
The development of the mining industry in the Republic determines the quality and condition of the land, causing pollution by such toxic substances as radioactive nuclides, heavy metals, etc. The mining industry has accumulated 4 billion tons of waste; concentration plants have accumulated 1.1 billion tons of waste and metallurgical industries have accumulated 105 million tons.

Semipalatinsk nuclear testing ground 
The total area of the ecological disaster zone is 7 million hectares, including the territory of the test site (1.8 million hectares) and the zones of emergency-level and maximum radiation risk (5.2 million hectares). Some 27.4 million hectares of agricultural land is registered in the impact zone of the Semipalatinsk testing ground (88.3% of the total area of the region).
By the Government Decree of the Republic of Kazakhstan No.172 of February 7, 1996 the Semipalatinsk test site lands became reserved lands and measures were identified to improve the ecological situation in the districts located in the zones of emergency-level and maximum radiation risk. The difficulty of full economic land development on the test site is that a radiological diagnostic study has not been completed in the area and the norms of the maximum permissible pollution of the lands have not been established. Due to the transfer of part of the Semipalatinsk test site lands to economic use, the priority objective is to conduct detailed studies and develop measures on the safe implementation of economic activity in these areas. Due to lack of funding such measures have not yet materialized.
The Semipalatinsk Nuclear Testing Polygon (SNTP) was established on August 21, 1947. Covering three oblasts-Western Kazakhstan, Karaganda and Pavlodar, SNTP occupies an area of 18,500 km2 with a perimeter of 600 km. The Polygon occupies 10,000 km2 of the former Semipalatinsk oblast. Nuclear tests were performed over the period between 1949 and 1989, with around 470 systems, including 30 surface, 86 air and 340 subsurface devices detonated. The power of the explosions reached 17,400,000 tons of trinitrotoluene equivalent. Initially, nuclear tests were performed to test nuclear explosive systems and armament samples, and later for economic purposes.
These tests resulted in the formation of the “atomic lake” Balapan, plus radioactive gas emissions in the air, environmental imbalance and negative health implications for people living in areas adjoining the SNTP site.
Reports indicate gamma-radiation levels many times exceeding the norm - up to 1,250 mcr/hr in Semiplatinsk in 1960-1980, which exceed the background level approximately 100 times, and up to 60,000 mcr/hr in Sarapan village. Pollution with radioactive isotopes of caesium and strontium exceeding the threshold was identified in Shagan and Aschisu rivers, Balapan Lake and other water sources within the SNTP site. At least 4,500 km2 of the Polygon area (land, rocks, water) are polluted with Cs-137 and Sr-90 in concentrations exceeding the threshold.
The environmental and agricultural implications and consequences of activities carried out at the Polygon are remarkable. Nuclear tests affected not only the Polygon's natural landscapes, existing ecosystems and agriculture, but also lands adjacent to the Polygon. Radionuclide pollution of milk and meat produced on farms located near the SNTP was sometimes registered at levels exceeding both the background level and safety requirements.
Currently, there is a clear need for the following to be carried out at the SNTP:
 Geological, geochemical, soil, hydrological and exploration work;
 Radiation, biological and chemical tests of the SNTP environment in order to obtain reliable information about the situation at the polygon including threats, risks and positive prospects for the zone adjoining the SNTP;
 Comparison of radiation levels in large and small doses;
 Estimation of carcinogenic, teratogenic and mutagenic risks when such doses are applied;
 Assessment of risks of stillbirth, congenital development and mental disorders, etc.

Azgir and Kapustin Yar testing grounds 
Three test sites were operating on the borders of Western Kazakhstan and Atyrau oblasts in the Naryn area: Azgir nuclear testing site, a state test-flight center and a state central testing ground, the last two belong to the Russian complex Kapustin Yar, and are still in operation. 29 nuclear explosions were conducted on the territory of these sites (18 underground, 11 in the atmosphere). Within the framework of research 10 nuclear explosions were additionally performed: 6 in Karachaganak, 3 in Mangistau and 1 in Aktubinsk oblasts.

Rocket Launching and Testing Sites 
Space and rocket equipment is considered to be among the most powerful source of the man-made impact on the global climate, environment and economies. There are 17 cosmodromes (space-vehicle launching sites or space centers) in the world.
Over the period 1957 to 2001, 1189 space rockets were launched from Baikonur to put into orbit 1237 space ships on various assignments. These launches also included more than 100 intercontinental ballistic rockets. From 2000 to 2001, 30% of the world's space rocket launching was carried out from Baikonur space center.
The location of space centers on the coasts of USA, France, Japan, Australia and India was done purposefully in order to reduce damage from accidents and prevent the fall of rocket stages and products of combustion in the residential areas. Only three countries – Russia, China and Kazakhstan - launch from landlocked continental space centers exposing the population of their countries to danger and polluting inhabited areas.

Total areas of polluted lands

National Environmental Management

National Policy 
The state program «Development Strategy 2030» identifies the following major public policy goals in the area of environmental protection and efficient natural resource use: stabilizing the quality of the environment, ensuring a favorable environment for human activity and preserving natural resources for future generations. Between 1994 and 2001 the Republic of Kazakhstan, recognizing the importance of natural resource conservation and its obligations to the international community, ratified 19 environmental conventions embracing preservation of all natural components, including transboundary elements.
Policy in the area of stabilizing environmental quality is aimed at:
 Securing the state's functions to own, dispose of and manage natural resources;
 Reducing the resource dependence of the economy and natural resource input per unit of output;
 Ensuring sustainable economic growth through the efficient use of natural resources;
 Analyzing the state of the environment, identifying causes, effects and objective criteria
The following documents have been prepared with the assistance of the international donor community: a National Environmental Action Plan for Sustainable Development, national strategies and action plans for biodiversity conservation, combating desertification, as well as forest and mountain ecosystem protection. The main sustainable development strategy documents - a Sustainable Development Framework and Agenda 21 are currently being developed.

Financial Mechanisms in the Area of Environmental Management and Protection 
Currently, major environmental payments are centralized to feed into the national budget. The Code for Taxes and Other Mandatory Budgetary Payments distinguishes the following environmental payments:
 Charge for environmental pollution;
 Charge for land use;
 Charge for use of water resources from surface water sources;
 Charge for fauna use;
 Charge for forest use;
 Charge for protected natural area use.

Environmental Legislation 
The Constitution of the Republic of Kazakhstan, which was adopted in 1995, forms the basis of national environmental legislation. Article 31 of the Constitution states that “the state shall set an objective to protect the environment favorable for the life and health of the citizen". Consequently, though the right to an environment favorable for life and health is not stipulated as a constitutional right, the fundamental law affirms the responsibility of the state to provide favorable environmental conditions for its citizens. The Constitution also states that officials shall be held accountable for the concealment of facts and circumstances endangering the life and health of the people. The access of the citizens of Kazakhstan to information on the environmental situation is viewed as a guarantee of the implementation of state policy on environmental protection.
In addition to the above-mentioned law, Kazakhstan has adopted a number of specific laws in the area of environmental protection:
 The Law on Protection, Reproduction and Use of Wildlife of October 21, 1993
 The Law on Environmental Expertise of March 18, 1997;
 The Law on Specially Protected Natural Territories of July 15, 1997;
 The Law on Protection of Atmospheric Air of March 11, 2002;

The Criminal Code in force from July 16, 1997 includes a special Article (#11) on environmental crime. This Article covers the following types of environmental offences:
 Violation of environmental statutory regulations of economic and other types of activity;
 Violation of environmental requirements during the process of production and use of potentially hazardous chemical, radioactive and biological substances;
 Violation of safety regulations during the process of handling microbiological and other biological agents or toxins;
 Violation of veterinary rules and regulations of pest and plant disease control;
 Water pollution, clogging and depletion of water resources;
 Air pollution;
 Pollution of the marine environment;
 Violation of legislation on the continental shelf of Kazakhstan and special economic zone of the country;
 Damage of land;
 Violation of regulations on protection and use of subsoil;
 Illegal capture of aquatic species and plants;
 Illegal hunting;
 Violation of regulations of wildlife protection;
 Illegal use and exploitation of rare and endangered species and plants;
 Illegal cutting down of trees and bushes;
 Destruction or damage of forests;
 Violation of the regime of specially protected natural territories;
 Failure to take measures to ameliorate the consequences of environmental pollution.

Waste processing and utilization 
Kazakhstan has practically no waste recycling enterprises. The few currently operating recyclers face a number of financial and organizational constraints. For instance, in Pavlodar there are two enterprises employing unique technologies (up to 96% of waste is used in the production process). They are: Pavlodar Ash-Sludge Waste Processing Plant JSC and EMEKO JSC. The base raw materials used by these enterprises are bauxite slime of
Aluminum of Kazakhstan JSC and ash waste of Pavlodar TES-1, resulting from combustion of Ekibastuz coal with high ash content. The plant produces 14 kinds of construction materials, such as brick (including fire-resistant), cement, etc. Provided the plant operates on a two-shift basis, it can annually process 32,000 tons of slime and 38 tons of ash. However, it cannot operate at full capacity due to lack of working capital.
Enterprises of the ore dressing and metallurgical complexes, petrochemical, heat-and-power generating facilities, coal pits, etc. use industrial waste for the mining-technical reclamation of tailings, ash dumps, overburden dumps and hosting rocks. Thus, in waste-intensive areas (East Kazakhstan, Karaganda, Kostanai and Pavlodar oblasts) the percentage of industrial waste usage varies, from 1.5-2% in Pavlodar oblast to 25% in Karaganda oblast. A high level of waste utilization has been achieved in this oblast in the last two years mainly due to the use of overburden and hosting rocks for technical reclamation of up to 85% of the used and disturbed land.
The metallurgical slime stored on test sites is usually buried. This is largely due to lack of efficient and cost-effective recycling technologies. A small part of the waste is used in production and construction technologies by Ispat-Karmet JSC (Karaganda oblast), where practically all metallurgical slag is processed and reused. Zhairem Tsvet Мет JSC and the Balkhash smelter of Kazakhmys Corporation process all the metallurgical slag accumulated throughout the year, together with ore, in the production of copper concentrate.

The following technologies of waste processing and neutralization are applied at Sokolovsko-Sarbaisky smelter (Kostanai Oblast): crushing of rocks for construction; use of mill tailings in the extraction of collective sulfide concentrate by a floatation unit and its further processing at the mining-chemical integrated works, although this technology has yet to be finalized.
In 2000 Maikainzoloto OJSC (Pavlodar Oblast) started to use off-balance ores from overburdened soil dumps, including dumps located in the Maikain settlement. Maikainzoloto JSC, jointly with Technopark- Stepnogorsk JSC, plans to apply environmentally friendly technology in the production of the copper-zinc concentrate without cyanides.

Ferrochrome JSC (Aktyube Oblast) is an example of successful industrial waste utilization and processing. This JSC has started to produce crushed stone from the scoria of high and low-carbon ferrochrome (more than
150.0 tons per year) and ferrodust (more than 4,000 tons per year) which is further used in the manufacturing of lime-and-sand brick (more than 12,000 pieces per year). In addition, the company plans to use a bin for the reception and sorting out of the waste for further recycling. A dedicated area will be used to store metal scrap.

Private sector participation in solid waste disposal helps to raise significantly the efficiency of recycling. For instance, in Pavlodar the situation improved after solid waste management was transferred to Polygon MDS JSC (accumulator of solid waste of III-IV class of hazard) and Spetsmashiny JSC (the city solid waste land fill). Another private company, which is part of Pavlodar Chemical Plant JSC, is engaged in collection, employing the technology of Tolyatti IFC Chelnok JSC (Russia). The enterprise has so far recycled more than 90,000 lamps. Experimental work has been conducted on ‘demercurization’ in the use of fluorescent lamps of Petropavlovsk by ZIKSTO JSC. In Almaty oblast the mercury-containing waste and fluorescent lamps are delivered for demercurization to the specialized enterprise Synap JSC (Almaty). A facility for the centralized collection, storage and recycling of utilized luminescent, mercury lamps and devices has been opened in Uralsk, western Kazakhstan.

Recycling efforts are being made in West Kazakhstan also. For instance, Stroitekh JSC has begun to recycle broken glass and produce consumer goods from them. A similar project is being developed by Zheksengaly JSC. Uralvtorma Research and Production Association has designed a project on recycling wood-shavings, scrap paper, wool to produce composite building slabs used in the construction industry.
In order to resolve the problem of waste management, it is necessary to develop a National Waste Management Program, spelling out waste management policies, a legal framework and methodology for waste disposal, an economic mechanism for waste management and monitoring. Implementation of this program requires: an inventory of existing tailings and dumps and assessment of their technical condition; specification and analysis of flows, volumes and components of accumulated and buried waste; assessment of risks for decision-making.

The potential for use of alternative energy sources 
Alternative or renewable energy sources include hydro-electric power, wind power, marine wave action, solar radiation, geothermal energy, energy of biomass and biogas.

Kazakhstan has significant potential in renewable energy sources, but only a small part of this is being used. This is due to the fact that Kazakhstan's energy sector was developed as part of the centralized energy supply system of the huge and ‘traditional’ electricity production stations of the former Soviet Union. The development of local energy sources was not emphasized.
The issue of renewable energy development has been highlighted for different reasons. The vast territory of Kazakhstan, its low population density and concentration of generating capacity mainly in the northern part of the country, mean that energy must be transported over significant distances, resulting in losses of up to 30%. Therefore, the centralization of the energy supply of remote areas is economically inefficient and the development of small and alternative energy supplies has the potential to solve some of the existing problems, in particular:
 Guaranteed energy independence,
 Organization of energy production at the location of its consumption,
 Improvement of ecological conditions,
 Provision of electricity to remote nomadic settlements and the work settlements of geologists and oil workers.
According to the survey “Kazakhstan and Kyrgyzstan - opportunities for the development of renewable energy sources” executed within the framework of the Program of Technical Assistance ESMAP in 1997, about 5100 remote settlements in Kazakhstan are not connected to electricity transmission lines. Under these conditions the development of renewable energy sources to provide local energy is economically justified.

Hydroelectric power 
Kazakhstan possesses significant potential for hydroelectric power, estimated at 170 billion kWh annually. The economic potential is 23.5 billion kWh and at present about 8 billion kWh are used annually. The development of small river potential in Kazakhstan is also quite promising. According to data of the Kazakhstan Institute “Hydroproject”, more than 503 projects are available for construction of hydroelectric power stations on small rivers, with an overall capacity of 1380 Megawatts. Possible electric power production by these small river power plants has the potential to produce around 6.3 billion kWh annually. The State Program of “Electro¬energy development until 2030” foresees construction of a number of hydroelectric power stations. The most promising projects are: Mainakskaya hydroelectric power station on the Charyn River, with a capacity of 300 Megawatts; and Kerbulakskaya hydroelectric power station on the Ili River, with a capacity of 50 Megawatts. Annual production of electric power by these river facilities may reach about 900 million kWh.

Wind power 
Due to its location, much of Kazakhstan is in the ‘wind belt’ of the northern hemisphere and is extremely rich in wind resources and thus of wind power. According to estimates, the density of the wind potential in Kazakhstan equals approximately 10 megawatts per square kilometer.

A number of areas in the northern, central, and southeast regions of Kazakhstan, and also in western Kazakhstan, have considerable wind potential. According to data from meteorological observation posts, the average wind speed in these regions exceeds 5 km/second and in some places reaches 6–7 km/second, making the use of wind potential a viable prospect. The Kazakhstan Institute, Kazselenergoproekt has surveyed at least 15 sites for the construction of large Wind Energy Stations (‘wind farms’) that have the capacity to produce several hundred megawatts. According to the 2030 Energy Development Program, a 500-megawatt wind power station (WPS) is expected to be built in Kazakhstan. These wind farms have the potential to produce 1-1.5 billion kWh of energy annually.

The wind potential of the Dzungarian and Sheleksky corridor in Almatinsky Oblast, southeast Kazakhstan, has been extensively investigated. Within the framework of technical assistance to Kazakhstan under the UN Development Program on wind energy development, detailed wind measurements have been carried out in these two regions, revealing significant wind potential. The average annual wind speed in the Dzungarian Gates is 7.5 km/s, and in the Sheleksky corridor - 5.8 km/s at a height of 10 meters. With support from the UNDP/GEF, the first pilot wind-driven power plant is expected to be constructed, producing 5 megawatts, in the Dzungarian Gates. The company Almatyavtomatika is currently installing the first Kazakh wind power plant at Druzhba in the Dzungarian Gates, with a production capacity of 500 kW. Other low-capacity wind farms have also been installed in several settlements. There are a number of small wind energy installation projects in Akmolinsky Oblast benefiting from Dutch technical assistance.
There are also prospects for wind energy use to raise water from wells using wind pumps. In Soviet period such wind pumps were widely used in the territory of Kazakhstan.

Solar energy 
In spite of the fact that Kazakhstan is located northward between latitudes 42 and 55, the potential solar radiation is significant and may produce 1300-1800 kWh per square meter. Due to the continental climate the number of solar hours is about 2200-3000 per year, making solar energy use possible.

The main area of solar energy use is the generation of hot water using solar collectors, or ‘suntraps’. According to estimates of local experts it is possible to generate about 13 million Gcal of heat for heating water supplies, allowing savings of more than 1 million tons of petroleum equivalent. The use of solar panels for heating water can be carried out both on boiler systems for a central heat supply and a heat supply for individual buildings. Now, with the support of UNDP and the Canadian Agency for International Development a pilot project is being carried out on the use of solar collectors in one boiler-house in Almaty.
In Kazakhstan there is great demand for solar collectors to heat water. However, they have not yet found wide application due to their high cost, at around 200-300 USD per 1 sq. meter. However, it is possible to significantly decrease the cost and expand the scale of their application if the solar collectors can be produced locally.

The other area of potential solar power use is the generation of electricity with the help of photo¬electric converters. Photo-electric panels can be used to generate electricity in small quantities for such needs as illumination, tele-radio broadcasting on small agricultural farms and shepherd camps. According to estimates from research conducted under the framework of ESMAP, application of small solar photo-electric panels with batteries can work out even more economical than the use of kerosene lamps for lighting. The possible market for 20-watt solar photo-electric panels in Kazakhstan should be about 20,000 units.

There are also opportunities for photo-electric panels’ application to operate small electric pumps to raise water from underground wells. A combination of photo-electric panels and wind-driven power plants for water pumps is also possible and will increase the reliability of water-supply. With the UNDP framework it is planned to implement a pilot project on water supply in remote areas in the Aral region, using photo-electric panels and wind-driven power plants which will produce electricity for pumps and a desalinization plant for preparation of potable water. The Ministry of Energy and Mineral Resources, MEP, and the Ministry of Education and Science are jointly developing a Programme on “Energy Saving and Development of Alternative Sources of Energy”.

Geothermal energy 
Kazakhstan has a number of places with underground sources of hot water. However, their practical use is restricted since the temperature of water is generally below 55 degrees.

According to the ESMAP research “Kazakhstan and Kyrgyzstan - opportunities for development of renewable energy sources” only one underground source of hot water above 96° has been found, close to Zharkent. This source can be used for heating needs.

Biomass 
Biomass energy is the generation of gas from waste vegetation, waste products of animal husbandry, household waste products, deposits of sewage, etc. Calculations show that processing annual waste from agriculture for biogas generation can produce an energy volume equal to 14-15 million tons of fuel equivalent, or 10.32 million tons of petroleum.
TACIS and UNDP Programs support the use of biogas by farmers and inhabitants of remote settlements as a means of preserving forest tracts, harnessing animal waste and preventing stream flow pollution. In a number of settlements installations for the generation of biogas from manure have been assembled. The experience shows that use of biogas installations producing 15 cubic meters of biogas per day (1 ton of manure for 4 months) ensures heating a building of 60 square meters and cooking meals for a family of 4-5 persons.

Tidal Energy 
The frontline of the Caspian Sea can serve as a source of wave energy. According to meteorological data it may be highly profitability to use wave power stations. There are projects of a modular wave power station with a capacity up to 3 megawatts. At a wave height of 3–5 meters, annual electricity production can reach about 3 million kWh with a cost price per 1 kWh of around 3-4 USD cents.

Realization of similar projects has the potential to supply oil-field settlements in the Caspian Sea area with independent energy sources and reduce current consumption of electricity from the national network by 50-85%.

Regional Cooperation in the Area of Environment and Sustainable Development

Regional programs and projects 
The Central Asian Region plays a major role in the world community by preparing and implementing environmental protection plans for the Aral Sea basin, demonstrated by leading international donor organizations (global, regional and bilateral) and executive agencies, such as the GEF, UNDP, UNEP, World Bank GroupWB, EBRD, ADB, KWF German Fund, Kuwait Fund of Economic Development of the Arab Countries and, USAID and by participating in different forms of technical assistance to CA states. The total amount of expected investment in the development and implementation of regional environmental programs and projects in the Aral Sea basin is in the range of 350-400 million USD. De facto disbursement of funds for resolving the environmental problems of the region does not exceed 10% of the intended finance. This depends mainly on the programs and project compliance with the national priorities and economic interests of the countries in the region, as well as on their activity in the co-financing of regional projects. As a result, Kazakhstan and Uzbekistan have an active agenda in the area of water management systems; Kazakhstan, Kyrgyzstan, and Tajikistan in the area of mountain ecosystems; Kazakhstan and Uzbekistan have an active agenda in the area of biodiversity; and Turkmenistan and Kazakhstan in the area of combating desertification.

The principal financing for regional projects is divided according to the following priorities: environmental problem of the Aral Sea 76% of total funds; protected mountain territories 16%; combating desertification and land degradation 2%; and other targeted projects 6%. It is obvious that trans-boundary issues - air and surface water pollution, waste utilization, combating densification of soil exposed to erosion - are not sufficiently covered by the regional programs. The above components are therefore often covered by national projects.

Implementation of the objectives specified (programs and projects) can only be achieved with close cooperation between environmental protection agencies of the CA countries during the development stage of a uniform regional environmental strategy.
The most significant initiatives of regional cooperation in Central Asia are as follows:
 Establishment of the International Fund for the Aral Sea (IFAS);
 «Agreement on Joint Actions for Addressing Issues of the Aral Sea and Adjacent Territories, Environmental Recovery and Promoting Social and Economic Development of the Aral Sea Region» dated 1993;
 Agreement on Establishment of the Central Asian Regional Union of the Countries of Central Asia and Kazakhstan (CARA);
 Nukous and Issyk-Kul Declarations. Establishment of the Interstate Commission for Sustainable Development (ICSD);
 Tashkent Declaration on Special UN Program for Central Asia Economies - SPECA ;
 Agreement on Cooperation in the Area of Environment and Rational Nature Utilization». Almaty Declaration, 1997;
 Participation of the CAR delegation in the Conference of Ministers for Environment Protection in Kits-Kiusiu. ESCATO Meeting (Tehran); resolution on creating a Regional Environmental Action Plan (REAP), 2000;
 Establishment of a Regional Environmental Center (REC) (1997-2000);
 April, 2000 - the First Eurasian Economic Summit "Eurasia-2000» in Almaty, presentation of SPECA;
 Ratification of the Orhus Convention by Kazakhstan, Tajikistan, Turkmenistan, and Kyrgyzstan;
 A renewable database has been created, and the Regional Report on “Environmental Conditions and Development of the Central Asia Region» has been prepared;
 The beginning of preparation to Phase II of the National Environmental Action Plans (NEAPs), 2001;
 Global Mountain Summit (BGMS), November 1, 2002, Bishkek, Kyrgyzstan- Mountain Platform was adopted, and the Central-Asian Mountain Charter was signed

Regional action plans 
The governments of the CAR countries have still not developed coordinated methods on integrated management that would take into account economic, social, and environmental issues on a comprehensive approach basis. This is mainly predetermined by the regional nature of ecosystems, and a necessity to take joint measures in resolving transboundary and inter-sector issues.
The process of “Environment for Europe”, which started in 1991 with the adoption of the Program of Actions for Environment Protection, played a key role for the countries of the region in implementation of the negotiation process. The Region's participation was supported by resolutions of the conferences, which were held in Sofia (1995) and Aahus (1998). In particular, in Aahus, the decision was made by CAR countries to begin drafting a regional environmental action plan (REAP), which was widely supported. The process of NEAP was an important stage, which was launched in the majority of the region's countries. It allowed a shift from comprehensive and unrealistic programs to priority actions and extensive work with donors. At present, the countries of the region participate extensively in similar programs established for the NIS in 2002.
The Regional Environment Action Plan for Central Asia (REAP) has been developed with the assistance and under the guidance of the UNEP/UNDP. Its goal is to create a basis for future of regional cooperation and the integration of efforts for the region's countries, aimed at preservation of the environment and the populations’ living conditions. A set of measures has been developed to resolve priority targets. The following key strategic targets related to environmental protection in the CAR countries have been identified for REAP:
 Sub regional Plan for Combating Desertification;
 Regional Plan for the Sustainable Development of Mountain Territories;
 Regional Pattern of Protected Natural Areas;
 Regional Plan of Water and Salt Management

Water resources 
Water challenges (resource, freshness and scarcity) in Central Asia are the main issues that need to be addressed. Environmental, social, and economic implications in the Aral region have a major impact on watercourses and energy needs. Fluctuations in seasonal demand for water resources and their unbalanced distribution are the results of conflicting preconditions that significantly influence the economic conditions of all countries in the region.
An agreement between the countries on the status of the Aral Sea and its adjacent territories, as independent water consumers, should help resolve the water challenges of the Aral basin and address the different countries’ water needs. Therefore, establishing a legal framework at the regional level should be an important factor in resolving such water-related conflicts as:
 Between the areas of water course formation and deltas;
 Between all water consumers and the environment;
 Between irrigation and hydro energy industry

The existing legal framework of water management should be determined by a set of policy documents (taking into account international water laws, as well as local traditions) which strictly regulate the parameters of cooperation in the area of water management and consumption. Establishment of a strong legal framework is a labor-intensive process, requiring involvement of highly skilled specialists, national experts and the general public.

In order to expand the issues identified for the Aral Sea basin, a number of regional programs and projects are being prepared with broad scope in the area of rational utilization of water resources and environmental protection:
 the Aral Sea Basin Programs (ASBP and ASBP-2);
 Regulation of the Syrdarya River bed and the Northern Part of the Aral Sea SYNAS, World Bank;
 Water Resource Management and Environment, GEF;
 Rational and Efficient Utilization of Water and Energy Resources in Central Asia: UN SPECA Program;
 CAR Natural Resource Management Project, USAID;
 Creation of a Forecasting System for Snowmelt Runoff for the Rivers within the Aral Sea Basin» USAID;
 Monitoring System for the Hydrological Cycle in the Aral Sea Basin; Aral-HYCOS

Regional cooperation in the area of utilization of land and water resources 
The problems of transboundary water resource utilization are still of utmost importance in resolving regional issues between Kazakhstan and neighboring countries, such as the Chinese People's Republic, Kyrgyzstan, Russia, and Uzbekistan. The existing water supply is one of the main constraints to developing the rich mineral, fuel, energy, and land resources of the country.
In order to establish closer regional cooperation in transboundary water apportioning, Kazakhstan joined the «Convention of Protection and Utilization of Transboundary Watercourses and International Lakes» on December 4, 2000.

Cooperation of CA countries in the area of transboundary watercourses 
Improvement of interstate water relations should be viewed as a key issue in terms of national security, particularly in the southern regions of Kazakhstan. In spite of the extensive activities conducted by the IFAS (International Fund for Saving the Aral Sea) and its branches, the urgent nature of transboundary water resource distribution in CAR is constantly growing.
The key documents regulating the distribution of water resources in the basin of the Syrdarya River are:
 Nukus Declaration of the Central Asian countries and international organizations on sustainable development of the Aral Sea basin, signed by the five Heads of the CAR states on September 20, 1995;
 Declaration of the Heads of the Republic of Kazakhstan, Kyrgyz Republic, and the Republic of Uzbekistan on Utilization of Water and Energy Resources, signed by the heads of these countries in Bishkek on May 6, 1996;
 “Specified Pattern of Comprehensive Utilization and Protection of Water Resources in the Basin of the Syrdarya River”; “Corrective Note to the Specified Pattern of Comprehensive Utilization and Protection of Water Resources in the Basin of the Syrdarya River”. This document determines the limitations of water resource sharing by sources, water management areas and parts of the basins, and fixes the share of each republic in the total amount of water resources of the basin of the Syrdarya River.

Cooperation in the area of transboundary watercourses with the Russian Federation 
Taking into consideration the significant amount of transboundary watercourses passing over the territory of  Russian Federation and Kazakhstan, on August 27, 1992, an interstate Agreement on Joint Utilization and Protection of Transboundary Water Facilities was signed in Orenburg. The Agreement regulates relations in the area of transboundary water facilities’ protection and utilization. Based on the Agreement, a Kazakhstan-Russia Commission was established, which approves time schedules of common use of water reservoirs and distribution of water intake limits and develops measures to conduct repair and operation of water management utilities.

Cooperation in the area of transboundary watercourses with China 
To resolve the issue of managing Transboundary Rivers with China, three rounds of negotiations were conducted by experts, which resulted in the approval of the provision on a Joint Working Group of Experts for Transboundary Rivers between the two countries. At the first meeting (November 6, 2000 in Almaty) of the Joint Working Group of Experts, a preliminary list of trans-boundary rivers was agreed and a list of action measures was specified.

Mountain ecosystems 
Undoubtedly, an important stage in the preservation of mountain ecosystems, is a project which proposes the strategy of «Regional Cooperation in the Area of Sustainable Development of Mountain Territories in Central Asia» (ABRD). Its key priority is facilitation and coordination of comprehensive research of mountain territories by monitoring.

The Bishkek Global Mountain Summit (BGMS) (Bishkek, October 29-November 1, 2002) became the principal outcome of the International Mountain Year, which attracted the international community's attention to the issues of mountain areas. The Bishkek Mountain Platform was adopted and a Central Asian Mountain Charter was signed. The Central Asian Mountain Charter was signed by the Ministers of Environmental Protection of Kazakhstan, Kyrgyzstan, and Tajikistan, containing the principles, goals and approaches on the management and utilization of mountain territories. It also contains an intention to draft a Central Asian Convention for the Preservation and Rational Utilization of Mountain Territories and the establishment of an International Negotiation Committee.

With support from the Asian Development Bank, the region's countries have developed a Central Asian Strategy for the Sustainable Development of Mountains. The Working Group set up, as well as the Regional Office in cooperation with the Regional Environmental Center (REC) of Central Asia, conduct activities to improve the adaptable Strategy for all countries of the region. The necessity has been justified to create the Regional Mountain Center (RMC), its activities aimed at resolving specific issues of mountain territories.

It worth noting that the intended and implemented projects in this area - Preservation of Biodiversity of the Western Tien Shan (GEF) and Preservation and Sustainable Utilization of Biodiversity of the Altai-Sayan Mountain Ecoregion (GEF) - cover only a minor part of the existing issues of mountain ecosystem preservation.

Biodiversity conservation 
A significant contribution to the well-being of the natural wealth are made by implemented, ongoing and planned national/regional projects for biodiversity preservation and expansion of protected territories. Activities in this sphere include:
 Preservation of Biological Diversity of the Western Tien Shan- GEF;
 Preservation and Sustainable Development of Biodiversity of the Altai - Sayan Mountain Eco-region- GEF;
 In-situ Preservation of Mountain Agro-biodiversity in Kazakhstan-GEF;
 Comprehensive Preservation of Priority Water and Wetlands as Habitats of Migratory Birds, GEF;
 Preservation of Globally Significant Water and Wetlands and Migration Corridors Required for Cranes and Other Globally Significant Migratory Waterfowl in Asia-WWF;
 Development of an Eco-network for long-term conservation of CA ecosystems.

Waste Processing Facilities 
The first municipal waste processing plant in Kazakhstan was opened in December 2007 in Almaty with support of local akimat. Vtorma-Ecology Plant covered 90% of the city's utilization of municipal solid waste (MSW). At that time Almaty accumulated about 600 tons of garbage per year. During 4.5–5 years, the company was to pay back $28 million investments and reach cost recovery by producing secondary materials - PET flex, plastic pellets, paper, ferrous and non-ferrous metals. But to the economic crisis the price of recyclables has fallen in 1,5-3 times, and the plant was not able to cover its costs and pay the loan, issued by "KazKom Bank". In October 2010 the plant was mothballed, criminal case of non-payment the wages was opened on Rustem Parmanbekov, director of the plant, and environmental prosecutor's office estimated the environmental damage in the amount of 7 million tenge.

In September 2012 Agency for Construction, Housing and Utilities of RK has presented the Program of construction of 41 waste processing plants around Kazakhstan within 10–15 years. Particularly, the Agency plans to open 10 plants until 2015.
As the Agency informs, the pilot projects will be launched in Aktobe, Atyrau, Karaganda, Abai, Saran, Shakhtinsk, Kostanay, Pavlodar, Taldykorgan, Taraz, Ust-Kamenogorsk, Kokshetau, etc.
These efforts will allow developing specific mechanisms of solid waste management in Kazakhstan and providing investors with one more sphere for investments.

First of the objects within the Program is Astana Waste Processing Plant, which was planned to open in October 2012 and cover all city needs in MSW utilization, with its productivity of 400,000 tons per year. The opening ceremony was held on December 24, 2012. This is the second waste processing plant in Kazakhstan after Almaty plant. The Astana plant was built on basis of Spanish technology.
As regards to Almaty Plant, which is still not operating, the Agency claims that owners have to deal with their economic problems themselves.

The Program also covers Shymkent city, which has a dramatic situation with spontaneously growing dump close to residential areas of the city. For residents of these neighborhoods proximity to the dump has turned into serious health problems. Due to constant acrid smoke and smell of burning people get such diseases as asthma, bronchitis etc.
The plant in Shymkent was planned to be built in 2007: "Construction is scheduled to start next spring and finish by fall," - declared the subcontractor in January 2007. But the choice of the landfill and other issues took more time than planned.
Only in December 2009 an investment agreement with Shymkent Akimat was signed and area for polygon and plant was defined. In Fall 2011 it was again announced that construction of the plant begins. Municipal budget allocated 430 million tenge for the necessary infrastructure needs. Until the end of the year builders acquired approximately 20 million tenge.

But in April 2012, Akimat refused to continue funding the project. For the moment the project is still frozen. Operation of the plant is now under threat due to insufficient funds for restoration and permanent increase of the area of garbage dump.

The Agency for Construction, Housing and Utilities of RK has also named the city of Pavlodar among the first cities, where the plants will be built until 2015. For the moment, Pavlodar Akimat has announced that they have already chosen the place of 100 hectares for the construction of polygon. Work is expected to deploy on the existing city dump.

Another plant is planned to be constructed in Karaganda. By today, "Taza Dala" company was founded to manage this project, places for construction and polygon have been chosen. Now there are negotiations being held with several banks to participate in the project.
Finally, in December 2012 it was announced that the modern MSW processing plant will be built in Aktau with support of EBRD: 2.4 billion tenge (€12.7 million equivalent) loan to State Communal Enterprise Koktem, Aktau's waste management company, will co-finance the new integrated mechanical-biological treatment facility and a new sanitary landfill. The project will be co-financed by the Clean Technology Fund which is providing a US$8 million loan.

The project will also be supported by a capital grant from the state budget.
The Korean Donor Fund provided nearly €300,000 and the EBRDShareholder Special Fund is providing grants of nearly €800,000 for project management, design, engineering, training, operational improvements and other associated spending.

References 

Kazahkstan
Environment of Kazakhstan
Economy of Kazakhstan